Corporal Sverre Granlund, DCM (9 November 1918 – 10 February 1943) was a Norwegian commando during the Second World War.

Early life and World War II
He was born in Sauherad in Telemark, to a father from Øyer and a mother from Høland. He lived initially in Saltdal and later, Bodø. His job was at the Nordland Line. He was a member of the Norwegian Red Cross Youth, and served in the Norwegian Army during the Battle of Narvik in 1940.

He fled Norway for Sweden in 1941, and later continued to the United Kingdom. Here he joined the Special Operations Executive and underwent training for the Norwegian Independent Company 1 (Kompani Linge). His first operation was on 27 May 1941 when he set the machine room of the fish factory in Bodø on fire.

Operation Musketoon
In 1942 he participated in the commando raid against the Glomfjord power plant (Glomfjord kraftverk) during Operation Musketoon. Granlund and Cpl. Erling Djupdraet were the two Norwegians in the twelve man team, the rest of whom were British.

He and Captain Joseph Houghton had the role of scouts, ascending the Svartisen. Granlund shot and killed a German who was dozing at the plant. After the explosions had torn apart the local dam, he sought refuge at Fykandalen, a mountain resort where he was given a map to a bridge that would lead him further up on the mountain.  Unable to find the bridge by nightfall, he met up with Houghton and Sergeant Erling Djupdraet and the three returned to the resort where a scuffle broke out between the group and some Germans who had come to question the owners.  After the fight, with one German killed, one wounded and Djupdraet wounded by a bayonet, Trigg, O'Brien, Granlund and Fairclough split off and managed to avoid capture, escaping to Stockholm, then London.

Erling Djupdraet died on 24 September at the hospital in Bodø and of the rest, only Lance Sergeant Richard O'Brien and Private John Fairclough, survived the war.

Operation Seagull
He died at sea on 10 February 1943 in transit to Norway, when the Norwegian submarine  hit a German minefield southwest of Fugløyvær, carrying his team as part of Operation Seagull.
The mines had been laid by the German minelayer  and some years after the end of the war, the Royal Norwegian Navy located HNoMS Uredd in Fugløyfjord south-west of Bodø, by studying German maps of minefields along the Norwegian coast.

Legacy
Granlund was awarded Norway's highest decoration for military gallantry, the War Cross with Sword. He also received the Norwegian War Medal and the British Distinguished Conduct Medal. In 1995, the Norwegian artist Laila Lorentzen commemorated his role in the war with a bust constructed for Saltdal Museum in Rognan.

See also
Norwegian resistance movement

References

Related reading
Schofield, Stephen (1964)  Musketoon: commando raid, Glomfjord, 1942  (University of Michigan)

1918 births
1943 deaths
People from Sauherad
Norwegian Army personnel of World War II
Norwegian expatriates in Sweden
Norwegian expatriates in the United Kingdom
Norwegian military personnel killed in World War II
Norwegian Special Operations Executive personnel
Recipients of the War Cross with Sword (Norway)
Recipients of the Distinguished Conduct Medal